The 15 cm SK C/28 was a German medium-caliber naval gun used during the Second World War. A number of surplus weapons were used as coast-defense guns and eight were adapted to use Army carriages and used as heavy field guns as the 15 cm Schiffskanone C/28 in Mörserlafette

Description
This gun was designed as a smaller and lighter version of the 15 cm SK C/25 guns used as the main armament of the - and s. It shared the earlier gun's design with a loose barrel, jacket and breech-piece with a vertical sliding breech block.

Naval mountings 
The Drh. LC/34 twin-gun mount was the most common mount for the gun in the Kriegsmarine. Each mount was designed for full 360° of traverse, but was limited to much less than that by the ship's superstructure. Speed in train was a maximum of 9° per second. The fastest firing cycle was 7.5 seconds, or 8 rounds per minute. Ammunition was supplied by twin hoists between the guns, at the rear of the mount. This may have designated as the Drh. LC/40, but development ceased when the ships were canceled in 1939.

The MPL C/28 mount used in the s was virtually identical to the newer mount except its gun shield was smaller so it weighed only .

The s were going to carry eight twin-gun Dopp MPL C/36 casemate mountings. The mount elevated at a speed of 6° per second and trained at a rate of 8° per second.

Coast defense mountings 
The Küsten-Marinepivotlafette (Küst. MPL C/36) was a highly successful mobile coast defense mount fitted with a gun shield. The gun traversed on a six-legged firing platform that allowed 360° of traverse. It was towed via two two-axle trailers, one at each end. For travel the four lateral legs of the platform folded vertically. It entered service in 1940.

Army mount
Production of carriages for the 21 cm Mörser 18 and the 17 cm Kanone 18 in Mörserlafette exceeded the available number of barrels in 1941 and eight SK C/28 barrels were adapted for use on the carriages as the 15 cm Schiffskanone C/28 in Mörserlafette. They were converted to Heer-standard percussion firing. Most guns were replaced by  barrels as they became available, but one battery retained them through the beginning of the Battle of Kursk in July 1943.

Ammunition 
The SK C/28 used several different shells depending on its target. It was a nose-fused HE shell with ballistic cap with two copper driving band and a lead ring behind them to act as a decoppering device by scraping away any copper residue from the driving band. The 15 cm Sprgr L/4.5 Bd Z m. It was roughly equivalent to the British "Common Pointed" and also used a lead decoppering ring. All shells used  of propellant in an artificial silk bag, housed in a brass cartridge case. An illumination shell was also available, although details are unknown.

History
Surplus naval mountings were used to reinforce German coast defenses from Norway to the French Atlantic coast. These included guns from incomplete or disarmed ships like the aircraft carrier  or the battleship . For example, three or four of the Graf Zeppelins Dopp MPL C/36 mounts equipped both batteries of Naval Artillery Battalion (Marine-Artillerie-Abteilung) 517 at Cap Romanov near Petsamo, Finland while two of the Gneisenaus Drh. LC/34 mounts were emplaced on the west coast of Denmark at Esbjerg where they equipped Batterie Gneisenau of Naval Artillery Battalion 518. All told, a total of 111 SK C/28 guns were employed on coast defense duties in a variety of mounts, 28 in Norway, 12 in Denmark, 24 in the German Bight, 8 in the Netherlands, and 39 in Belgium and the Atlantic coast of France.

Surviving guns in Norway and Denmark were used throughout the Cold War by both countries.

See also
 List of naval guns

Weapons of comparable role, performance and era
 BL 6 inch Mk XXIII naval gun: approximate British equivalent
 6"/47 caliber Mark 16 gun: approximate US equivalent

Footnotes
Notes

Citations

References

External links

 SK C/28 on navweaps.com
 history of the guns at Langesland fortress, Denmark 
 history of the guns at Stevnsfort, Denmark

150 mm artillery
World War II artillery of Germany
Naval guns of Germany
World War II naval weapons
Coastal artillery
Military equipment introduced in the 1930s